The Roman Catholic Diocese of Rēzekne–Aglona is a diocese located in the cities of Rēzekne and Aglona in the Ecclesiastical province of Riga in Latvia.

History
 2 December 1995: Established as Diocese of Rēzekne–Aglona from Metropolitan Archdiocese of Riga

Special churches
Minor Basilicas:
Vissvētākās Jaunavas Marijas Debesīs Uzņemšanas Bazilika in Aglona(Basilica of the Assumption of the Blessed Virgin Mary)

Leadership
 Bishops of Rēzekne–Aglona (Roman rite)
 Jānis Bulis (7 Dec 1995 – )

See also
Roman Catholicism in Latvia

Sources
 GCatholic.org
 Catholic Hierarchy

References

Roman Catholic dioceses in Latvia
Christian organizations established in 1995
Roman Catholic dioceses and prelatures established in the 20th century